Yerakai (Yerekai) is a Sepik language spoken in Sandaun Province, Papua-New Guinea. It is highly divergent from other Sepik languages, being only 6% cognate with other Middle Sepik languages. Glottolog leaves it unclassified.

It is spoken in Yerakai village, Yerakai ward, Ambunti Rural LLG, East Sepik Province.

External links 
 Paradisec has a collection of Don Laycock's (DL2) that includes Yerakai language materials.

References

Middle Sepik languages
Languages of East Sepik Province
Language isolates of New Guinea